Television in Mali was introduced in 1983.

The following is a list of television channels broadcast in Mali.

Main channels

See also 
 Television in Mali (in French)
 Media of Mali
 Telecommunications in Mali
 Lists of television channels

References

 
Television